Israel Alejandro Damonte (born 6 January 1982 in Salto, Buenos Aires) is an Argentine football manager and former player who played as a midfielder. He is the current manager of Sarmiento.

Biography
He was born in Salto, an important agricultural town in northern Buenos Aires Province.

Career

Damonte started his professional career playing with Estudiantes de La Plata in 2000. After not having much continuity, he was sent on loan to Quilmes for six months. Then he returned to Estudiantes till the end of 2003.

During 2004 to mid-2005, he remained playing for San Martín de Mendoza.

In July 2005, he signed a new contract with Argentine Primera División side Gimnasia y Esgrima de Jujuy where he played a total of 33 matches and scored 5 goals.

In May 2006, he signed a three-year deal with the Mexican team Veracruz. Soon after not having much continuity with the first team, he was loaned for half a season to Nueva Chicago.

In August 2007, Israel was transferred to Arsenal de Sarandí, were his outstanding performances helped the team win the 2007 Copa Sudamericana. He scored a goal in the round of 16 against Brazilian club Goiás. In January 2008, he signed a two years contract with Super League club Asteras Tripoli.

In August 2010, Damonte joined Godoy Cruz. In January 2012, he signed for Nacional. In January 2013, he signed for Estudiantes. In January 2018, he signed for Huracán.

Coaching career
Damonte retired at the end of 2019 and on 2 January 2020, he was announced manager of his former club, Huracán.

Managerial statistics 
As of 21 June 2021

Honours

References

External links
 
 

1982 births
Living people
Sportspeople from Buenos Aires Province
People from Salto Partido
Argentine footballers
Argentine expatriate footballers
Association football midfielders
Uruguayan Primera División players
Argentine Primera División players
Liga MX players
Super League Greece players
Estudiantes de La Plata footballers
Quilmes Atlético Club footballers
Nueva Chicago footballers
Gimnasia y Esgrima de Jujuy footballers
Arsenal de Sarandí footballers
Godoy Cruz Antonio Tomba footballers
Asteras Tripolis F.C. players
C.D. Veracruz footballers
Club Nacional de Football players
Club Atlético Huracán footballers
Club Atlético Banfield footballers
Expatriate footballers in Greece
Expatriate footballers in Mexico
Expatriate footballers in Uruguay
Argentine football managers
Argentine Primera División managers
Club Atlético Huracán managers
Arsenal de Sarandí managers
Club Atlético Sarmiento managers